Viktor Mostovik (7 January 1963 – 12 December 2010) is a retired Moldovan race walker. He won his first medal, a bronze, at the 1981 European Athletics Junior Championships.

He finished fourth at the 1986 European Championships and the 1987 World Championships, representing the Soviet Union, and twelfth at the 1993 World Championships. He also finished third at the 1985 World Race Walking Cup and second at the 1987 World Race Walking Cup.

International competitions

References

1963 births
Living people
Moldovan male racewalkers
Russian male racewalkers
Soviet male racewalkers
World Athletics Championships athletes for the Soviet Union
World Athletics Championships athletes for Moldova
Universiade medalists in athletics (track and field)
Universiade gold medalists for the Soviet Union